The 1935 Sevenoaks by-election was held on 20 July 1935 in the Sevenoaks parliamentary constituency.  The by-election was necessary due to the retirement of the incumbent Conservative MP, Edward Hilton Young, who received the newly created title Baron Kennet.  It was won by the Conservative candidate Charles Ponsonby.

References

1935 in England
Sevenoaks
1935 elections in the United Kingdom
By-elections to the Parliament of the United Kingdom in Kent constituencies
Unopposed by-elections to the Parliament of the United Kingdom (need citation)
1930s in Kent
July 1935 events